Asnières-lès-Dijon (literally "Asnières near Dijon") is a commune in the Côte-d'Or department in the Bourgogne-Franche-Comté region of eastern France.

The inhabitants of the commune are known as Asniérois or Asniéroises.

Geography
Asnières-lès-Dijon is located just 8 km north of Dijon. The commune lies between the D903 road which follows its western border from Dijon to Savigny-le-Sec and the D974 which follows the eastern border from Dijon and continues to Til-Châtel. The D104 links the two roads through the village and also continues east to Bellefond. The commune is mixed forest and farmland with a substantial urban area covering some 20% of the commune.

Neighbouring communes and villages

History
After the defeat of France in 1870-1871, Dijon was chosen with Langres, Besançon, Reims, Laon, and La Fère to be a "second line" of the Séré de Rivières system of defence (the first line being focused on Verdun, Toul, Epinal, and Belfort). A series of forts and military redoubts centred on Dijon city were built from 1875 to 1883: la Motte-Giron, Mont-Afrique, Hauteville, Asnières, Norges, Var, Saint-Apollinaire, and Sennecey-lès-Dijon.

Built between 1876 and 1877, Fort Brûlé had the honour of suffering the first armed clash with Prussia.

Fort Brûlé did not defend Dijon during the two world wars. It was the Germans who used it as a storehouse for ammunition during the Second World War. These caused considerable damage in 1944 when the Germans blew up ammunition in the fort: so much so that with the exception of the protruding buttress on Saliant II, there is virtually nothing left of the left half of the fort.

The fort is now the property of a private owner.

The commune has had a very high level of population growth since the 1970s when it was a peaceful farming village. Many employees from the CEA at Valduc came to live there. The population of the commune increased six times in 40 years.

Heraldry

Administration

List of Successive Mayors

Demography
In 2017 the commune had 1,184 inhabitants.

The commune is part of the community of communes Norge et Tille.

Culture and heritage

Civil heritage

The commune has two sites which are registered as historical monuments. These are:
Fort Brûlé (1876)
The Cemetery (1402)

Religious heritage
The Parish Church of Saint-Alban contains one item registered as a historical object:
Eucharistic tower (14th century)
The Parish Church of the Nativity contains several items which have been registered as historical objects:
Painting: Sainte-Famille and his family (17th century)
Statue: Saint Claude (17th century)
Statue: Saint Abdon (17th century)
Group sculpture: Virgin of pity (16th century)
Retable: Apostolic cortege (15th century)
Statue: Virgin and child (15th century)

Facilities
Asnières has shops (bakery, butcher, a small hall, and a petting zoo) and various facilities including a hall and sports grounds (tennis, football, basketball, rugby). The town also has a nursery and primary school.

It also has a Judo club - the Entente Judo Messigny-et-Vantoux - Val de Norge (Ejmn)

See also
Communes of the Côte-d'Or department

References

External links
Asnières-les-Dijon on the Val-de-Norge website 
 Asnières-lès-Dijon on the old IGN website 
Asnières-lès-Dijon on Géoportail, National Geographic Institute (IGN) website 
Asnieres on the 1750 Cassini Map

Communes of Côte-d'Or